Michael Scott Tully (born October 21, 1956) is an American pole vaulter. He represented the United States twice in the Olympics, earning a silver in 1984, and held the American pole vault record from 1984 to 1985.

Early career
Born in Long Beach, California, he went to college at UCLA and was the NCAA champion in the pole vault in 1978 with a height of 5.53 metres. He won three national titles in 1977, 1979 and 1986. He also took the AAA Championships in 1976 and 1979 and the French championship in 1977.

He enjoyed great success at the Mt. SAC Relays, winning four pole vault titles, each at a meet record height. His last victory came at a height exactly one foot higher than the first. He also holds the distinction of being the first vaulter to clear 18 feet in the competition.  His efforts earned him the honor of induction into the Mt. SAC relays hall of fame in 1994.

International career
Tully won the first two World Cup competitions, the 1977 and 1979 IAAF World Cup. He qualified for the 1980 U.S. Olympic team but was unable to compete due to the 1980 Summer Olympics boycott. Tully did however receive one of 461 Congressional Gold Medals created especially for the spurned athletes. He competed at the 1983 World Championships without registering a valid mark. In a one-month period in 1984 he raised the American record three times by a total of almost three inches. He concluded the season with a silver medal at the 1984 Olympic Games. He took the American record from Jeff Buckingham, but his national record was broken in 1985.

At the Pan American Games he won gold medals in 1983 and 1987 Pan American Games, both times with championship records, first 5.45 metres then 5.71 metres. He also finished fourth at the 1986 Goodwill Games.

References

1956 births
Living people
American male pole vaulters
Track and field athletes from Long Beach, California
World record holders in masters athletics
Medalists at the 1984 Summer Olympics
Olympic silver medalists for the United States in track and field
Athletes (track and field) at the 1984 Summer Olympics
Athletes (track and field) at the 1983 Pan American Games
Athletes (track and field) at the 1987 Pan American Games
Pan American Games gold medalists for the United States
Pan American Games medalists in athletics (track and field)
Congressional Gold Medal recipients
Millikan High School alumni
Competitors at the 1986 Goodwill Games
Medalists at the 1983 Pan American Games
Medalists at the 1987 Pan American Games